My Kind of Jazz is a 1970 album by Ray Charles.

Track listing
 "Golden Boy" (Charles Strouse, Lee Adams) – 3:34
 "Booty Butt" (Ray Charles) – 4:11
 "This Here" (Bobby Timmons) – 4:43
 "I Remember Clifford" (Benny Golson) – 3:39
 "Sidewinder" (Lee Morgan) – 3:29
 "Bluesette" (Toots Thielemans) – 3:22
 "Pas–Se–O–Ne Blues" (John Anderson) – 4:43
 "Zig Zag" (Bill Baker) – 4:31
 "Angel City" (Teddy Edwards) – 4:24
 "Señor Blues" (Horace Silver) – 5:24

Personnel
Bobby Bryant, Bill King, Marshall Hunt, Blue Mitchell - trumpet
Glen Childress, Henry Coker, Joe Randazzo (and Edward Comegys? or Fred Murrell? or David Phelps?) - trombone
J. Lloyd Miller - alto saxophone, oboe
Curtis Peagler - alto saxophone
Andy Ennis, Albert McQueen, Clifford Scott - tenor saxophone
Leroy Cooper - baritone saxophone
Ben Martin - guitar
Edgar Willis - bass
Ernest Elly - drums
Teddy Edwards - arranger (track 9 only)

References
Tangerine 1512

External links
 Album summary at warr.org

1970 albums
Ray Charles albums
Albums produced by Quincy Jones
Jazz albums by American artists
Rhino Records albums
Tangerine Records (1962) albums